James Kenelm Clarke (born 1941 at Great Rissington, Gloucestershire) (died, Norfolk 2020) is an English film director. He was educated at Leighton Park School and studied music with René Leibowitz in Paris.

Career
At the age of 18 he wrote the music for Michael Darlow's film All These People and then many scores for Anglia Television's plays (under George More O'Ferrall) and then at the suggestion of Sir John Woolf joined Anglia Television full-time in 1961 as a researcher on Anglia's local programme About Anglia. In 1967, he joined BBC Television in London as a producer on the award-winning progmme Man Alive, edited by Desmond Wilcox. Clarke produced reporters Esther Rantzen, John Pitman, Joan Bakewell and James Astor. He also contributed films to the Braden's Week and That's Life! teams.

He directed and co-produced the feature film Got It Made (1974) starring Lalla Ward, before setting up Norfolk International Pictures Limited in London. Norfolk International made the following feature films for the international market: Exposé (1976), Hardcore (1977), Let's Get Laid (1978), The Thirty Nine Steps (1978), The Music Machine (1979), Paul Raymond's Erotica (1981) and Funny Money (1983). His last known film was Going Undercover (1988), aka, Yellow Pages (completed 1985), which went straight to video in the United Kingdom.

He was CEO of Norfolk Music Publishing Ltd.

Selected filmography
 Got It Made (1974)
 Exposé (1976)
 Hardcore (1977)
 Let's Get Laid (1978)
 The Thirty Nine Steps (1978)
 The Music Machine (1979)
 Paul Raymond's Erotica (1981)
 Funny Money (1983)
 Going Undercover (1988, straight to video in the UK as Yellow Pages)
 Stalker (executive producer, 2010)

References

External links

1941 births
Living people
British film directors
British film producers
People from Cotswold District